Westoverledingen is a municipality in the Leer district in Lower Saxony, Germany.

It contains about a dozen villages. The biggest of them are Flachsmeer, Völlen and Ihrhove, where the town hall is located. Völlen lies at the southern edge of the municipality, close to the Meyer-Werft shipyard in Papenburg. Many villagers are employed there.

Most villages have interesting old churches, including five that date from the Middle Ages.

The Bundesstraße 70 the connects the municipality to Papenburg and Leer. Westoverledingen does not have a train station. The Emsland Railway passes the municipality between stations Leer and Papenburg. The Ihrhove–Nieuweschans railway splits off from it towards Weener station. The Ihrhove railway station is to be reopened in 2024 or 2025.

A touristic bicycle trail, following the Ems, goes through Westoverledingen.

Westoverledingen's economy is dominated by agriculture. Many of its inhabitants, however, have a job in nearby towns like Leer or Papenburg.

Villages

Westoverledingen is divided into 12 Ortsteile for administrative purposes. The larger ones have their own elected local councils (Ortsrat) while the smaller ones have a local representative (Ortsvorsteher) appointed by the municipal council.

References

Towns and villages in East Frisia
Leer (district)